Orak Island is an Aegean island in Turkey

The name of the island orak ("sickle") refers to spit to the south of the island.
It has been speculated that the ancient name of the island might be "Bakkheion". According to surface survey of Professor Ömer Özyiğit, the island was inhabited during the classical age up to late Roman Empire era. There were three stone pits. One of them was probably a cult center of the goddess Cybele.

References

Islands of Turkey
Islands of İzmir Province
Foça District
Aegean islands
Gulf of İzmir